Zhang Zhijian (born May 1934) is a general (shangjiang) of the People's Liberation Army (PLA) of China.

Biography
Zhang was born in 1934 in Wenxi, Shanxi. He joined the PLA in 1951. In 1992 he became the Deputy Commander of the Beijing Military Region, and later served as Political Commissar of the Chengdu Military Region. He attained the rank of major general in 1988, lieutenant general in 1990, and full general in 1998.

References

1934 births
Living people
People's Liberation Army generals from Shanxi
People from Yuncheng
Delegates to the 7th National People's Congress
Delegates to the 8th National People's Congress
Deputy commanders of the Beijing Military Region
20th-century Chinese military personnel